Acidipropionibacterium olivae is a Gram-positive bacterium from the genus of Acidipropionibacterium which has been isolated from Spanish-style green olives from Sevilla in Spain.

References 

Propionibacteriales
Bacteria described in 2014